Siebenbürgen was a melodic black metal band from Stockholm, Sweden, formed in 1994.

History
The band was formed in 1994 by Marcus Ehlin and Anders Rosdahl, who were joined within a few months by Fredrik Brockert. In February 1996 they recorded their first, self-titled, demo tape. After the demo's release, the band was joined by Linus Ekström. By this time, they had started playing gigs, supporting Swedish metal acts including Bewitched, Sacramentum and In Aeturnum.

During the Halloween weekend of 1996 Siebenbürgen recorded their second demo, Ungentum Pharelis. This demo led to a contract with Napalm Records, and their release of their first album, Loreia, in 1997. In October/November 1997, Siebenbürgen had three shows in Germany, with Forbidden Site and Menhir. During January/February 1998, Siebenbürgen recorded their second album, Grimjaur, which was released in May the same year, followed by another tour in July, this time with Atanatos and Ragnarök. After the release of Grimjaur, Lovisa Hallstedt, who had contributed female vocals and violin on all previous releases, left the band. She was replaced in 1999 with a new female vocalist, Kicki Höijertz.

On their next tour, Siebenbürgen were accompanied by Tristania, The Sins of Thy Beloved, Trail of Tears and Antichrisis. The tour consisted of 18 shows, performed in Germany, Austria, Netherlands, Belgium and Switzerland. Beginning with the follow-up to Grimjaur, titled Delictum, Siebenbürgen made what many still consider to be a departure from their previous direction, choosing to write lyrics in English instead of Swedish (though some albums during the early to mid 2000s contain songs in Swedish). As the lyrics continued to depict creatures from old folklore, written in the style of dark poetic fairytales, some defend the position that Siebenbürgen merely opted to use a more widely spoken language for their lyrics, in order to be more inclusive to fans who do not understand their native language, whilst leaving the actual content of their output unchanged.

After a hiatus starting in 2006, they reformed in 2007 with a new lineup. In 2008, Revelation VI was released.

Siebenbürgen disestablished again in 2009.

Discography
Studio albums
 Loreia (1997)
 Grimjaur (1998)
 Delictum (2000)
 Plagued Be Thy Angel (2001)
 Darker Designs & Images (2005)
 Revelation VI (2008) 

Live albums
 Siebenbürgen - Live (1996)

Demo albums
 Siebenbürgen (1996)
 Ungentum Pharelis (1996)

Members
 Recent
Lisa Bohwalli Simonsson – vocals
Marcus Ehlin – vocals, bass
Richard Bryngelsson – guitars
Joakim Ohlsson – guitars
Johnnie Gunther – keyboards
Dennis Ekdahl – drums 

 Former
Lovisa Hallstedt – violin, backing vocals
Erika Roos – vocals
Kicki Höijertz – vocals
Turid Walderhaug – vocals
Fredrik Brockert – bass
Niklas Sandin – bass
Linus Ekström – guitars
Fredrik Folkare – guitars
Anders Rosdahl – drums

References

External links
 Official MySpace
 At Napalm Records

Swedish black metal musical groups
Swedish gothic metal musical groups
Musical groups established in 1994
Musical groups disestablished in 2009
Musical groups from Stockholm
Massacre Records artists
Napalm Records artists